Woodman is a surname. Notable people with this surname include:

 Andy Woodman (born 1971), English goalkeeping coach for Newcastle United
 Arturo Woodman (born 1931), Peruvian engineer and politician
 Dean Woodman (born 1929), American investment banker and co-founder of Robertson Stephens
 Dorothy Woodman (1902–1970), British socialist activist and journalist
 Francesca Woodman (1958–1981), conceptual photographer in the late 1970s and 1980
 Fred Woodman (born 1958), New Zealand rugby union player
 Freddie Woodman (born 1997), English footballer
 Frederick T. Woodman (1871–1949), American political figure and former mayor of Los Angeles
 H. Rea Woodman (1870–1951), American author and educator
 Jack Woodman (1914–1984), English footballer
 Kawhena Woodman (born 1960), New Zealand rugby union player
 Marion Woodman (1928–2018), Canadian psychoanalyst and writer
 Nick Woodman (born 1975), American businessman founder of GoPro
 Pierre Woodman (born 1963), French porn director
 Portia Woodman (born 1991), New Zealand rugby player
 Richard Woodman (born 1944), English novelist and naval historian
 Richard Woodman (martyr) (1520s – 1557), English Protestant martyr
 Trevor Woodman (born 1976), English rugby union footballer
 William Robert Woodman (1828–1891), co-founder of the Hermetic Order of the Golden Dawn

See also 

 Woodman (disambiguation)
 Wood (surname)

English toponymic surnames